Valeri Vladimirovich Bakin (born 16 June 1967) is a former Russian football player.

References

1967 births
Living people
Soviet footballers
Russian footballers
FC Spartak Kostroma players
FC Shinnik Yaroslavl players
Russian Premier League players

Association football defenders